Stocks refers to a device used to imprison the feet as punishment.

It may also refer to:
Stock, the equity of a company, referred to as Stocks and Shares
Stocks (surname)
Stocks (shipyard), an external framework used to support ships while under construction

See also
Stock (disambiguation)